Actodus is a genus of beetles in the family Carabidae, containing the following species:

 Actodus longeantennatus Lecordier, 1966
 Actodus treichi Alluaud, 1915

References

Licininae